State Highway 103 (SH 103) in the U.S. state of Colorado runs from Interstate 70 (I-70), U.S. Route 6 (US 6) and US 40 at Idaho Springs to county roads 151 and 103 at Squaw Pass.  The 13 miles (19 km) from Idaho Springs to SH 5 forms about half of the Mount Evans Scenic Byway.

Route description
East of where the route begins at County Road 151, the highway is not marked by CDOT, where it continues as 
Squaw Pass Road that descends toward Evergreen. Near Squaw Pass, the highway heads west along the upper end of Echo Mountain Ski Area. The highway then reaches an elevation of 10,000 feet at Echo Lake Park, where it meets SH 5. At this point, both SH 103 and SH 5 forms the Mount Evans Scenic Byway, which is the highest paved road in North America. The route then descends in elevation, heading northeast along the Chicago Creek, then enters Idaho Springs after crossing Clear Creek. SH 103 terminates at Interstate 70 at a diamond interchange and the road continues as 13th Avenue through the neighborhood.

History
The route was established in 1923, where it began at US 285 and traversed to Idaho Springs. The segment east of Squaw Pass was renumbered in 1954, and the route was entirely paved by 1956.

Major intersections

Gallery

See also

 List of state highways in Colorado

References

External links

 Colorado Routes 100-119

103
Transportation in Clear Creek County, Colorado